Tamar Football Club was an association football club which represented Launceston in the Northern Premier league in the years before World War II. Tamar won the inaugural northern league in 1912, and went on to gather a further 6 prior to the war. Like many clubs that existed before the war, they failed to resume after the war ended. Like their northern pre-war rivals, Invermay, they failed to convert their northern dominance into state championships.

Honours
State Championship Runners-up: 5 times (1921,1931,1932,1933,1934)
Northern Premierships: 7 times (1912,1913,1921,1931,1932,1933,1934)

References 

Defunct soccer clubs in Tasmania
1910 establishments in Australia
1939 disestablishments in Australia
Association football clubs established in 1910

Defunct soccer clubs in Australia